Project Runway Australia 3 is the third season of the reality competition Project Runway Australia, airing on Arena. It premiered on 4 July 2011.

Overview
Several changes have been made to the judging panel this season. It was announced on 10 January that model and actress Megan Gale will replace Kristy Hinze as host and main judge. Fashion designer Kirrily Johnston and Global Production Director of IMG Fashion Jarrad Clark make up the new judging panel. Henry Roth has also been replaced as design mentor by fashion designer and Australia's Next Top Model judge Alex Perry.

Contestants

Models
Hannah Ubl
Mary Vitinaros
Jenna Hall
Alicia Kromodomos
Samantha Howard
Flora Blaik
Milica Vujic
Cheyney Belle
Holly Lee Boorman
Sahara Deng
Floral Lin Yang
Cailin Moore

Challenges

 The designer won the competition
 The designer won the challenge
 The designer was eliminated
 The designer had a high score for the challenge
 The designer came in second but did not win the challenge
 The designer was in the top two, or the first to be announced as a high scoring designer
 The designer had a low score for the challenge
 The designer was in the bottom two
 The designer withdrew from the competition
 The designer was brought back into the competition

:  Although Gabrielle and Dylan were the winning team, Dylan was announced as the overall winner of the challenge.
:  The 4 most recently eliminated designers were brought back for the challenge, and Nerida won a place back in the competition

Episode summary

Episode one

Original airdate: 4 July 2011

The first challenge of the season required the designers to create a cocktail dress utilizing three different fabrics of the same colour. The designers did not get to choose their own fabrics, and their colour scheme was based on the colour of the dress their model was wearing.

 Guest Judge Camilla Franks
 Winner: Johnny Schembri
 Out: Anthony Allars

Episode two

Original airdate: 11 July 2011

Alex introduced the designers to Dannii Minogue and Tabitha Somerset-Webb, who tasked them with creating an evening look for their label, Project D. The winner of the challenge will have their design manufactured and sold with Project D's Spring/Summer 2011 collection.

 Guest Judges Dannii Minogue & Tabitha Somerset-Webb
 Winner: Craig Braybrook
 Out: Amanda McKenna

Episode three

Original airdate: 18 July 2011

The designers were taken to a wharf, where they had three minutes to choose items of second-hand clothing from a pile consisting of over 16,000 pieces to use as the materials for their challenge, which was to create a modern daywear look. However, they did not get to work with the items they chose, passing their clothing to the person on their left instead. At judging, Megan announced that two designers would be eliminated.

 Guest Judge Terry Biviano
 Winner: Claire Hocking
 Out: Anna McEachran & Timothy Godbold

Episode four

Original airdate: 25 July 2011

Working in pairs, the designers were tasked with creating two looks influenced by the various collections of iconic Australian designer Carla Zampatti over the 1960s, 1970s, 1980s and 1990s. The teams chose their own team leaders and had two days for the challenge. During the second day, Alex announced that one piece of clothing from each pair had to be made out of denim.

 Guest Judge Carla Zampatti
 Winner: Dylan Cooper
 Out: Nerida Bourne

Episode five

Original airdate: 1 August 2011

This week, the designers were reunited with their loved ones for their challenge. Each designer had to create a glamorous, 'million dollar' look for one of their competitors' relatives. Family members randomly selected the designer they would work with.

 Guest Judge Claudia Navone
 Winner: Johnny Schembri
 Out: Claire Hocking

Episode six

Original Airdate: 8 August 2011

The remaining designers were flown to the Gold Coast for inspiration for their next challenge. Designers were split into pairs in order to create two resort wear looks inspired by the Gold Coast. Anna, Timothy, Nerida & Claire (the four most recently eliminated designers) were brought back and told that one of them would win a place back in the competition.

 Timothy voluntarily left the competition midway through the challenge, leaving Nerida to create only one look for the runway.

Johnny & Dylan's designs receive the most praise and won the challenge, Nerida's outfit was deemed the best of the returnees and was back in the competition, Claire's outfit was deemed the worst and Anna receive some praise but her fit let her down, Matcho's outfit was deemed the best he's done but Rachael's was heavily criticized both for construction and design, Gabrielle's construction receive praise but her colour choice was deemed boring and Craig's outfit was criticized for not being fashion forward. Craig was given another chance while Rachael was eliminated.

 Winner: Johnny Schembri & Dylan Cooper
 Back into The Competition: Nerida Bourne
 Out: Rachael Perks

Episode seven

Original Airdate: 15 August 2011

Alex informed the designers that they would be creating a look for glamorous, internationally known Australian celebrity. It was then revealed that their client was host and head judge Megan Gale. The outfit for Megan had to be suitable for an event.

 Guest Judge Camilla Freeman-Topper
 Winner: Nerida Bourne
 Out: Gabrielle Stephens

Episode eight

Original Airdate: 22 August 2011

The remaining designers were challenged with re-designing a well known red carpet fashion disaster into a fashionable evening look, using the fabrics and materials of the outfit they chose.

 Guest Judges
 Winner: Craig Braybrook
 Out: Matcho Suba

Episode nine

Original Airdate: 29 August 2011

It is the final challenge and the last chance for the four remaining designers to prove they are worthy of a place at Melbourne Fashion Week. Alex takes them to the Melbourne Fashion Festival's runway to give them their final challenge. They have two days to create an haute couture gown worthy of the runways of Paris, New York and Milan.

 Guest Judges: Collette Dinnigan
 Winner: Johnny Schembri
 Out: Nerida Bourne
 Final Three: Johnny Schembri, Craig Braybrook, Dylan Cooper

Episode ten

Original Airdate: 6 September 2011

The final three have been selected and they now face their final challenge: create a collection of 10 designs which will be showcased at a live fashion show in front of their fashion industry peers. They have is a budget of $10,000, and two months to put the collection together. Alex pays each designer a home visit to offer them support and his expert advice on their collections. Once they return to Melbourne to prepare the finale, Alex breaks the news that they have one more challenge to conquer, straight out of the pages of Madison magazine.

Episode eleven

Original Airdate: 13 September 2011

It's the final countdown to the runway, and every second counts as the final three cast and fit models for their shows, and race to complete their garments in time.

 Winner: Dylan Cooper 
 Runnerup: Craig Braybrook
 3rd Place: Johnny Schembri

External links 
To watch hard to find episode 11:

References

Season 03
2011 Australian television seasons
2011 in fashion